The 2002 Spanish motorcycle Grand Prix was the third round of the 2002 MotoGP Championship. It took place on the weekend of 3–5 May 2002 at the Circuito Permanente de Jerez.

The race became significantly notable in later years, as it marked the professional debut of future MotoGP champion Jorge Lorenzo, who reached the legal age limit of 15 years old on the second day of free practice.

MotoGP classification

250 cc classification

125 cc classification

Championship standings after the race (MotoGP)

Below are the standings for the top five riders and constructors after round three has concluded.

Riders' Championship standings

Constructors' Championship standings

 Note: Only the top five positions are included for both sets of standings.

Notes

References

Spanish motorcycle Grand Prix
Spanish
Motorcycle Grand Prix